is a railway station on the Hankyu Railway Kyoto Line located in Higashiyodogawa-ku, Osaka Prefecture, Japan.

Layout
The station has 2 elevated island platforms, serving 2 tracks each. Local trains for Takatsuki-shi arrive at Line 1 during the non-rush hour to let Kyoto-bound limited express trains pass Line 2.

History 
Aikawa Station opened on 28 January 1916.

Station numbering was introduced to all Hankyu stations on 21 December 2013 with this station being designated as station number HK-65.

Stations next to Aikawa

References

External links
 Aikawa Station from Hankyu Railway website

Hankyu Kyoto Main Line
Higashiyodogawa-ku, Osaka
Railway stations in Osaka
Railway stations in Japan opened in 1928